Norrö is a locality situated in Österåker Municipality, Stockholm County, Sweden with 305 inhabitants in 2010.

References 

Populated places in Österåker Municipality